Coal Valley is an extinct town in Boone County, in the U.S. state of Iowa. The GNIS classifies it as a populated place.

History
Coal Valley was platted in 1867 as a coal mining community. Once the coal deposits were exhausted, Coal Valley's business activity shifted elsewhere and its population dwindled. The former town site now is farmland.

References

Ghost towns in Iowa
Landforms of Boone County, Iowa
1867 establishments in Iowa